The Way We Are may refer to:

 The Way We Are (film), a 2008 Hong Kong drama
 The Way We Are, or Quiet Days in Hollywood, an American drama
 The Way We Are (Chemistry album), 2001
 The Way We Are (Fleming and John album), 1999
 The Way We Are, an album by George Shearing
 "Way We Are" (song), a 2014 song by Kove featuring Melissa Steel
 "The Way We Are" (song), a 2015 song by Alesha Dixon
 The Way We Are, a novel by Allen Wheelis